The women's team regu sepak takraw competition at the 2002 Asian Games in Busan was held from 2 October to 6 October at the Minseok Sports Center in Dongseo University.

Squads

Results 
All times are Korea Standard Time (UTC+09:00)

Preliminary round

Group A

|-
|rowspan=2|3 October||rowspan=2|10:00
|rowspan=2 align=right|
|rowspan=2 align=center|0–3
|rowspan=2 align=left|
|colspan=3|0–2||colspan=3|0–2||colspan=3|0–2
|-
|9–21||3–21|| ||5–21||5–21|| ||7–21||11–21||

Group B

|-
|rowspan=2|2 October||rowspan=2|10:00
|rowspan=2 align=right|
|rowspan=2 align=center|2–1
|rowspan=2 align=left|
|colspan=3|1–2||colspan=3|2–0||colspan=3|2–0
|-
|19–21||21–10||10–15||21–10||21–10|| ||21–12||21–18||
|-
|rowspan=2|3 October||rowspan=2|13:00
|rowspan=2 align=right|
|rowspan=2 align=center|1–2
|rowspan=2 align=left|
|colspan=3|1–2||colspan=3|2–1||colspan=3|0–2
|-
|6–21||14–21|| ||24–22||15–21||15–13||14–21||9–21||
|-
|rowspan=2|4 October||rowspan=2|10:00
|rowspan=2 align=right|
|rowspan=2 align=center|0–2
|rowspan=2 align=left|
|colspan=3|0–2||colspan=3|1–2||colspan=3|
|-
|16–21||12–21|| ||15–21||21–19||14–16|| || ||

Knockout round

Semifinals

|-
|rowspan=2|5 October||rowspan=2|13:00
|rowspan=2 align=right|
|rowspan=2 align=center|0–3
|rowspan=2 align=left|
|colspan=3|0–2||colspan=3|0–2||colspan=3|0–2
|-
|16–21||18–21|| ||13–21||12–21|| ||13–21||11–21||
|-
|rowspan=2|5 October||rowspan=2|16:00
|rowspan=2 align=right|
|rowspan=2 align=center|0–3
|rowspan=2 align=left|
|colspan=3|0–2||colspan=3|0–2||colspan=3|0–2
|-
|20–22||13–21|| ||6–21||16–21|| ||7–21||7–21||

Final

|-
|rowspan=2|6 October||rowspan=2|13:00
|rowspan=2 align=right|
|rowspan=2 align=center|2–0
|rowspan=2 align=left|
|colspan=3|2–0||colspan=3|2–1||colspan=3|
|-
|21–12||21–7|| ||21–10||19–21||15–9|| || ||

References 

Official Website
2002 Asian Games Official Report, Page 592

Sepak takraw at the 2002 Asian Games